Pericardiacophrenic veins are the vena comitans of the pericardiacophrenic arteries. Pericardiacophrenic vessels accompany the phrenic nerve in the middle mediastinum of the thorax. The vein drains into the internal thoracic vein, or brachiocephalic vein.

References

Veins of the torso